The Republican Building 
() is a 
historical landmark building and a hospital from the early 20th 
century located at the Shandong University campus, in the city of Jinan, Shandong Province, China. 
The building was originally part of the hospital of Cheeloo University. Construction of the building was sponsored by the British Baptist Church. Work began in 1914 and was completed the
following year. The building was officially inaugurated on September 
27, 1915 by the military governor of Shandong, Jin Yunpeng.

See also
List of sites in Jinan

References and external links

Buildings and structures in Shandong